Uqah (also, Ugah, Uchakh, Uga, and Ugakh) is a village in the Shabran Rayon of Azerbaijan.  The village forms part of the municipality of Çaraq.

References 

Populated places in Shabran District